The ExoLife Finder Telescope (ELF) is a proposed hybrid interferometric telescope intended to directly detect and image the surface of potentially Earth-like planets.

The telescope, which was proposed by the PLANETS Foundation, consists of an array of telescopes arranged in a circle from a parent parabola. Each telescope has primary and secondary adaptive mirrors.

These mirrors form a common image with the resolution equivalent to the diameter of the array.

The ELF is designed with the use of light-weight mirrors and tensegrity-based mechanical support, which makes it scalable, affordable, and rapidly buildable within 3–4 years.

To image the surface of, for example, Proxima b, the array should be at least 12 meters in diameter. A 20m array would be able to image dozens of exoplanets in the Solar neighborhood.

References 

 
Astronomical imaging
Astronomical instruments
Exoplanets